William Cauldwell House is a historic home located at Noyack in Suffolk County, New York. It was built in 1892 for newspaper publisher William Cauldwell, and is a three-story, three bay wide building with a steeply pitched, side gabled roof, a two-story central dormer extending from the second through the third stories and a single story, wrap-around porch. It is in the Queen Anne style.

It was added to the National Register of Historic Places in 2009.

References

Houses on the National Register of Historic Places in New York (state)
Houses completed in 1750
Houses in Suffolk County, New York
National Register of Historic Places in Suffolk County, New York